Plectotropis mackensii is a species of air-breathing land snail, a terrestrial pulmonate gastropod mollusk in the family Camaenidae.

This species is endemic to Taiwan.

References

External links
 Pilsbry, H. A. (1902). New land mollusks of the Japanese Empire. The Nautilus. 16(4): 45-47
  Wen P. Y. & Hwang C. C. (2014). "Comparative anatomy of Aegista (Aegista) subchinensis and Aegista (Plectotropis) mackensii (Gastropoda: Bradybaenidae)". Bulletin of Malacology, Taiwan 37: 33–44. (with English abstract). abstract.

mackensii
Gastropods described in 1850